The Collins COBUILD Advanced Dictionary (CCAD) from HarperCollins, first published in 1987, is a dictionary that distinguished itself by providing definitions in full sentences, rather than excerpted phrases. Example sentences are given for almost every meaning of every word, drawn from a large corpus of actual usage.

Except for the 6th edition, it included phonetic transcriptions based on the International Phonetic Alphabet (IPA). In some editions, a digital version on CD-ROM was included with the dictionary in book form.

The CCAD seems to be lacking in American English definitions. However, it has an American English equivalent titled Collins COBUILD Advanced Dictionary of American English.

Editions
First edition published in 1987 as Collins COBUILD English Language Dictionary
Second edition published in 1995 as Collins COBUILD Learner's Dictionary
Third edition published in 2001 as Collins COBUILD English Dictionary for Advanced Learners
Fourth edition published in 2003 as Collins COBUILD Advanced Learner's English Dictionary
Fifth edition published in 2006 as Collins COBUILD Advanced Learner's English Dictionary
Sixth edition published in 2008 as Collins COBUILD Advanced Dictionary (CCAD)
Seventh edition published in 2012 as Collins COBUILD Advanced Dictionary of English
Eighth edition published in 2014 as Collins COBUILD Advanced Learner's Dictionary
Ninth edition published in 2018 as Collins COBUILD Advanced Learner's Dictionary

Notes

External links 
Collins COBUILD Advanced Dictionary

English dictionaries